Eternity is an Australian news service for Christians that has a magazine and online publication. It claims the Nicene creed as its statement of faith, and is not affiliated with any church. John Sandeman, a Sydney Anglican, is the editor-in-chief.

Though the Eternity magazine is published quarterly with a circulation of 100,000, Eternity online publishes articles daily.

The printed format has five main content focuses:

 personal testimonies
 missionary news
 book excerpts
 social justice
 perspectives on popular culture.

The online format has nine content categories:

 Good news
 Australia 
 In depth 
 Opinion
 Culture
 World
 Videos
 Podcasts
 Faith Stories

History 
In 2009, David Maegraith and John Sandeman discussed a desire for a quality news publication created for a Christian audience in Australia. A first draft of the paper was called Australian Christian. The name was changed by Sanderman shortly after to Eternity, a word notably used by Arthur Stace.

In May 2011, Eternity became part of the Bible Society Australia, a broad-based interdenominational organisation that is a member of the worldwide United Bible Societies. Sandeman subsequently moved from owning Eternity to being an employee of the Bible Society Australia.

In October 2011, ABC radio's John Cleary interviewed Sandeman about the publication's first year.

In media

ABC 
In a 2019 article entitled "When you don’t know that you don’t know: Academic misrepresentation of Australian Pentecostalism" references author Mark Jennings Eternity article "Why the media targets Pentecostals."

In Julia Baird's 2017 article, "Christian conference attendees walk out after speakers suggest women should grow their hair long, defer to men at work" for the ABC, she referenced an Eternity article "When cutting your hair can be an ungodly act" which reported on a controversial meeting at a Christian women's conference.

Sydney Morning Herald 
In May 2018, Michael Kozial quoted Sydney law professor Patrick Parkinson's comments from an Eternity article "Religious Freedom Push Revs Up: Expectations set about Canberra response while Christian Democrats submit bill in NSW", in an article for The Sydney Morning Herald.

The Guardian 
In 2019, in an article entitled "Scott Morrison calls for ‘more love’ as he prays for Australia at Hillsong conference," Katharine Murphy referenced an Eternity article entitled "Scott Morrison prays for Australia at Hillsong Conference."

60 Minutes 
In 2021 60 Minutes responded to Eternity'''s article, "Hillsong is red meat for media: what 60 minutes is serving up this week" which described the actions of a Hillsong employee as a, "story of a drunken encounter and an unpleasant touch". 60 Minutes responded, "If you want to know what's wrong with Hillsong, you need only look at the completely tone-deaf way the megachurch and its supporters have responded to our investigation broadcast on Sunday night".

 News.com.au 
In 2019, in an article entitled "Scott Morrison asks for more prayers, more love at Hillsong conference in Sydney", Shannon Molloy referenced Eternity'''s article.

References

External links 
 

Christian magazines
Magazines established in 2009
Monthly magazines published in Australia
Magazines published in Sydney